The Mission Hill School was a small preK–8 public pilot school in the Jamaica Plain neighborhood of Boston, Massachusetts. Founded in 1997 by Deborah Meier, Elizabeth Knox Taylor, and colleagues, the school was administered by the Boston Public Schools. Meier has publicized the school in many of her works.

The Mission Hill School was a member of the Coalition of Essential Schools. The school had a diverse student body of approximately 220 students, with democratic decision-making at the school and classroom levels, a curricular focus on five democratic "Habits of Mind", school-wide thematic units, a strong emphasis on the arts, and graduation from the school upon creating and defending portfolios of student work for a panel of evaluators. Students were admitted to the school based on a lottery, within the choice system of the Boston Public Schools (with consideration given to whether families lived within the "walk zone" and whether a sibling already attended the school, among other factors). Graduates have been found to achieve academic success in high school and college at high rates. 

In 2002, Meier's book In Schools We Trust included substantial attention to the Mission Hill School. It argued that the current climate of high-stakes testing makes running a school like Mission Hill much more difficult. She also wrote about the school in her books Will Standards Save Public Education? (2000) Keeping School: Letters to Families from Principals of Two Small Schools (with Ted and Nancy Sizer, 2005), Playing for Keeps: Life and Learning on a Public School Playground (with Beth Taylor and Brenda Engel, 2010), and Teaching in Themes: An Approach to Schoolwide Learning, Creating Community, and Differentiating Instruction (co-edited with Matthew Knoester, Katherine Clunis D'Andrea). The school is also the focus of the book by Matthew Knoester Democratic Education in Practice: Inside the Mission Hill School (2012), as well as the 2014 documentary "Good Morning Mission Hill," directed by Tom and Amy Valens. Mission Hill School published a periodic newsletter for the school community, including reflections by staff, students, and family members; digital copies of the newsletter (including issues from 2001-2022) are available through the Boston City Archives. The school was controversially moved to a different location within Boston in 2012, despite resistance from the school community. 

In 2022, following an investigation by law firm Hinckley Allen into allegations of failure to properly address bullying and sexual misconduct between students, Boston Public Schools superintendent Brenda Cassellius recommended permanently closing the school at the conclusion of the 2021-2022 academic year. Mayor Michelle Wu also voiced her support for closure. Despite organizing efforts by family members, staff, students, and community members, on May 5, 2022, the Boston School Committee voted 5-0 (with one member abstaining and one member absent) to close the school at the end of the 2021-2022 school year in June 2022.  Many Mission Hill School family members, teachers, and students criticized Boston Public Schools' lack of transparency throughout the investigation as well as the harmful impacts of the decision to close the school.

References 

Democratic education
Coalition of Essential Schools
Small schools movement
Jamaica Plain, Boston
Elementary schools in Boston
Middle schools in Boston
Progressive education